Tropacocaine (tropacaine, benzoylpseudotropine, pseudotropine benzoate, descarbomethoxycocaine) is a cocaine-related alkaloid and a contaminant of street cocaine.

Chemistry

Synthesis 
It can be synthesized from tropine using the Mitsunobu reaction.

See also 
Hydroxytropacocaine
Benzoylecgonine
p-Fluorotropacocaine
Indatraline
Tropane alkaloid

References 

Tropane alkaloids found in Erythroxylum coca
Benzoate esters